(born September 13, 1995) is a Japanese professional wrestler working for Gleat. He is best known for his time in Pro Wrestling Zero1, where he is a former United National Heavyweight Champion.

Professional wrestling career

Independent circuit (2019–present)
Tamura made his professional wrestling debut at JTO Yume, an event promoted by Professional Wrestling Just Tap Out at September 24, 2019 where he fell short to his coach Taka Michinoku. At YPW Kubota Brothers Produce ~ We Can Do It!!, an event promoted by Yanagase Pro Wrestling on November 15, 2020, he teamed up with Arata to defeat Jade and Shogun Okamoto.

Pro Wrestling Zero1 (2020–2021)
Tamura made his debut in Pro Wrestling Zero1 on August 27, 2020, at ZERO1 New ZERO1 where he defeated Chris Vice to win the World Heavyweight Championship. At BJW/ZERO1 Clash, a cross-over event promoted by Zero1 in partnership with Big Japan Pro Wrestling on December 4, 2020, Tamura teamed up with Yuji Okabayashi to pick up a victory over Hideyoshi Kamitani and Takuho Kato. At BJW/ZERO1/2AW Big Clas, a cross-over event produced by Zero1 in partnership with Big Japan Pro Wrestling and Active Advance Pro Wrestling on April 7, 2021, Tamura teamed up with Ayato Yoshida and Daichi Hashimoto in a losing effort to Daisuke Sekimoto, Kengo Mashimo and Masato Tanaka as a result of a six-man tag team match.<ref>{{cite web|url=https://www.z-1.co.jp/results/detail_571_3.html|script-title=ja:ZERO１vs大日本プロレスvs2AW　合同興行　～大激突～|work=z-1.co.jp|author='Pro Wrestling Zero1|date=April 7, 2021|access-date=September 19, 2021}}</ref> At ZERO1 20th Anniversary Series on May 4, 2021, Tamura teamed up with Masato Tanaka in a losing effort to Cima and Daisuke Sekimoto.

He is known for competing in the promotion's signature events such as the Fire Festival, making his only appearance at the 2020 edition where he won the Block B with a total of twenty-two points after competing against Chris Vice, Masato Tanaka, Yuko Miyamoto, Tsugutaka Sato, Shogun Okamoto and Takafumi, but fell short to Hartley Jackson in the finals from November 1.

As for the Furinkazan tournament, Tamura participated in a side match at the 2020 edition where he teamed up with Kanon and Ren Ayabe in a losing effort to Asuka and Revengers (Masato Tanaka and Takuya Sugawara).

Gleat (2021–present)
Tamura made his debut in the Gleat promotion on July 1, 2021, at GLEAT Ver. 1 where he fell short to El Lindaman.

Championships and accomplishmentsPro Wrestling IllustratedRanked No. 152 of the top 500 singles wrestlers in the PWI 500'' in 2022
Pro Wrestling Zero1
World Heavyweight Championship (1 time)
Gleat
G-Infinity Championship (1 time, current) – with Check Shimatani

References 

1995 births
Living people
Japanese male professional wrestlers
People from Gunma Prefecture